The lieutenant governor of Michigan is the second-ranking official in U.S. state of Michigan, behind the governor.

The current lieutenant governor is Garlin Gilchrist, a Democrat, who has held the office since January 1, 2019.

Process

In Michigan, the governor and lieutenant governor are elected as a ticket to serve a term of four years. The election takes place two years after each presidential election; thus, the next election will take place in November 2026.

Nomination
Following the August primary election in each gubernatorial election year, the state's two largest political parties convene a state convention and nominate candidates for lieutenant governor, secretary of state and attorney general, among other offices. Because the governor and lieutenant governor are elected as a ticket, the party's gubernatorial nominee usually makes the de facto decision as to whom the party will nominate for lieutenant governor, then convention delegates officially confirm the designation.

Historically, the governor and lieutenant governor were elected separately, leading to occasions where Republicans controlled one office and the Democrats another (as with George Romney and T. John Lesinski). This changed with the Michigan Constitution of 1963.

Election and inauguration
After the November general election, the governor and lieutenant governor take office on January 1. Thus, the winners of the 2022 election began their term on January 1, 2023.

Term limits
Like the governor, the lieutenant governor is allowed to serve up to two terms in office.

Duties
There are three main duties assigned to the lieutenant governor:
 to serve as acting governor while the governor is out of state;
 to become governor if the governor is unable to serve due to death, illness or incapacitation; and
 to preside over the Michigan Senate.

These days, the lieutenant governor also acts as an assistant to the governor. When the governor is unable to attend a function, for instance, the lieutenant governor may be sent in place of the governor. The lieutenant governor will also occasionally head blue-ribbon commissions into pressing public policy issues.

List of lieutenant governors

Parties
 (18)
 (43)
 (3)

Notes

Source: Michigan Manual 2003-2004, Chapter IV, Former Officials of Michigan

External links
 Office of the Lieutenant Governor
 Lt. Governor’s Commission on Higher Education & Economic Growth

 
Michigan
Lieut
1835 establishments in Michigan Territory